Ragnarsson is the patronymic of the Scandinavian given name Ragnar. It remains in use as a true patronymic in Iceland, and as a surname in Sweden.

Patronymic
Baldur Ragnarsson (born 1930), Icelandic poet and author of Esperanto works
Halfdan Ragnarsson, Viking chief and one of the sons of Ragnar Lodbrok with Aslaug
Ubbe Ragnarsson, Norse leader during the Viking Age

Surname
Cecilia Ragnarsson (born 1987), Swedish model and beauty pageant titleholder and winner of Miss International Sweden 2010
Huggy Ragnarsson (born Hugrún Ragnarsson), an Icelandic-American fashion photographer and former fashion model, born in Reykjavik, Iceland
Julia Ragnarsson (born 1992), Swedish actress
Kristjan T. Ragnarsson, physiatrist with an international reputation in the rehabilitation of individuals with disorders of the central nervous system
Marcus Ragnarsson (born 1971), retired Swedish professional ice hockey defenseman
Ómar Ragnarsson (born 1940), Icelandic politician and environmentalist as well as a former entertainer and news reporter